The Squash competition at the World Games 2017 took place from July 25 to 28, in Wrocław in Poland, at the Hasta la Vista Sport Club.

Schedule
All times are Poland Time (UTC+2)

Medals table

Medals summary

See also
 Squash at the World Games

References

 
2017 World Games
Squash records and statistics